Syed Iqbāl Aẓīm (1913-2000) was an Urdu poet and scholar of Urdu language in the Bengal region.

Career

He was head of the Department of Urdu, Dhaka College and Chittagong College. He used to regularly attend mushairas in Dacca.

Literary work

His works include Sat Sitaray, Chiragh-i-Akhir-i-Shab and Mahasal

See also
Dhakaiya Urdu

References

1913 births
2000 deaths
Urdu-language poets from Pakistan
People from Karachi
People from Saharanpur
20th-century poets
Academic staff of Dhaka College
People from Meerut
Muhajir people